Wild at Heart (Spanish title: Corazón indomable) is a Mexican telenovela produced by Nathalie Lartilleux for Televisa. It is a remake of the 1994 Mexican telenovela Marimar.

Ana Brenda Contreras and Daniel Arenas star as the protagonists, while Elizabeth Álvarez stars as the antagonist, with the special participation of César Évora.

As of January 30, 2017, Las Estrellas is broadcasting re-runs of Corazón indomable at 12:00pm replacing Mañana es para siempre and ended on June 30, 2017, with Lo que la vida me robó replacing it on July 3, 2017.

Univision started broadcasting Corazón indomable weeknights at 7pm/6c on May 13, 2013 replacing Corona de lágrimas. The last episode was broadcast at 8pm/7c on December 22, 2013 with Mentir para Vivir replacing it the next day

Plot
Maricruz Olivares lives with Ramiro, her maternal grandfather, and Solita, who is Deaf and who was found abandoned, by her mom Guadalupe Mendoza/Guadalupe Olivares and her grandpapa when she was a little baby. She lives in a shack located in the middle of nature, near the Narvaéz's ranch property line. Miguel and Octavio are siblings and they both own the Narvaéz's Ranch, which is mortgaged because of the bad administration Miguel, the older brother, has made. Octavio is a pilot and arrives in the ranch in need of money since he has lost his job and wants the lands to be sold. He doesn't imagine that soon he will forget this purpose and will discover that the earth, the sowing and sharing with the workmen become a source of passion for him.

Octavio meets Maricruz while he is traveling around the lands and catches his foreman trying to take her on. Regardless of her humble origins, he defends her as a gentleman. Immediately, he is trapped by her sympathy and beauty. When Octavio discovers the malice with which Lucia, his sister-in-law, treats Maricruz, he gets really angry and decides to marry Maricruz in order to teach his brother and Lucia a lesson. But Maricruz continues to get dissed and judged for her way of being, talking, acting and eating.

However, when he receives a tempting job offer as a pilot, Octavio leaves the ranch and asks his brother to give Maricruz his part of the land. Lucia and her cousin Esther set a trap for Maricruz to accuse her unjustly of being a thief and ends up in jail. A lawyer believes in her and achieves her freedom; but when she returns, she is shocked to discover that her grandfather died during a fire by Lucía's order done by Eusebio.

Maricruz leaves to the capital city with her sister Solita and starts working as a maid at Alejandro's house, who happens to be her father, without any of them knowing about the bond between them. Maricruz gains his trust and love, and he helps her to get educated and become a high society woman. In the meantime she accepts to help him with the administration of the casino-cruise ship, posted in Isla Dorada. There she will have to face the ambition of the Canseco sisters Carola and Raiza, who keep their lives comfortable at Alejandro's cost.   Alejandro's butler; Tobías, discovers Maricruz's birth certificate where her real name appears: María Alejandra Mendoza Olivares. In order to avoid the big impression that could kill Alejandro, since he suffers from a heart disease, he decides not to reveal him that Maricruz is his daughter, but he does tell Maricruz the truth and she feels very happy with such news.

Miguel informs his brother that Maricruz disappeared after her grandfather's death. Octavio arrives in the casino, invited by a friend. Octavio's good looks catch the interest of sophisticated women and he feels flattered, but he cannot forget Maricruz. He doesn't imagine that the humble youngster who used to be his wife is no other than the elegant María Alejandra Mendoza, the heir, manager and main host of the casino-cruise ship.

Cast

Main  

Ana Brenda Contreras as Maricruz Olivares / Maria Alejandra Mendoza Olivares
Daniel Arenas as Octavio Narváez
Elizabeth Álvarez as Lucía Bravo de Narváez
César Évora as Alejandro Mendoza

Secondary 

María Elena Velasco as María
René Strickler as Miguel Narváez
Rocío Banquells as Carola Canseco
Manuel Landeta as Teobaldo
Ignacio López Tarso as Don Ramiro
Ana Patricia Rojo as Raiza Canseco
Carlos Cámara Jr. as Eusebio Bermúdez / Nazario Bermúdez
Juan Ángel Esparza as José Antonio
Isadora González as Simona Irazábal
Yuliana Peniche as Ofelia
Gaby Mellado as Soledad "Solita" Olivares
Ricardo Franco as Eduardo Quiroga
Michelle Ramaglia as Aracely·
Elizabeth Valdez as Esther "Esthercita" Bravo de García
Antonio Fortier as Tony

Recurring 
Sergio Goyri as Álvaro Cifuentes 
Maribel Fernández as Dominga
Ingrid Martz as Doris Montenegro 
Carlos de la Mota as Elemír Karím
Alejandro Tommasi as Bartolomé
Arleth Terán as Natasha
Gerardo Arturo as Perico
Silvia Manríquez as Clementina
Luis Uribe as Mohamed
Luis Couturier as Francisco
Queta Lavat as Lucretia

Awards and nominations

References

External links 

Mexican telenovelas
Televisa telenovelas
2013 Mexican television series debuts
2013 telenovelas
2013 Mexican television series endings
Television series reboots
Spanish-language telenovelas